Florian Dumitru Pârvu (born 30 April 1991) is a Romanian professional footballer who plays as a midfielder for Liga III side Viitorul Dăești.

Honours
Viitorul Dăești
 Liga IV: 2018–19

References

External links
 
 

1991 births
Living people
Sportspeople from Râmnicu Vâlcea
Romanian footballers
Association football midfielders
Liga I players
Liga II players
SCM Râmnicu Vâlcea players
CS Universitatea Craiova players
CSM Corona Brașov footballers
FC Costuleni players
CS Sportul Snagov players
ACS Viitorul Târgu Jiu players
CS Luceafărul Oradea players
Romanian expatriate footballers
Expatriate footballers in Moldova
Romanian expatriate sportspeople in Moldova